Amir Jadidi (born June 20, 1984) is an Iranian actor and tennis player. He is well known in Iran for his starring roles in Crazy Rook (2015), A Dragon Arrives! (2016), The Lost Strait (2018), Cold Sweat (2018) and Day Zero (2020), whereas he is best known internationally for his role as Rahim in A Hero, which won the Grand Prix at the 2021 Cannes Film Festival. Jadidi has won the Crystal Simorgh for Best Actor at the 36th Fajr Film Festival for his performances in the war drama The Lost Strait and the sports drama Cold Sweat.

Early life 
Jadidi got his bachelor in Industrial Engineering and was graduated from Azad University in MBA.

Career

2010–2014: Career beginnings
Jadidi debuted as an Actor in 2011 with Houman Seyedi's Africa, as a young criminal with his friends who are ordered to keep a girl inside a house until her brother pays his debts. The film was praised for its new different style and strong acting.

In 2014, he starred in Thirteen and End of the Service films, for which he earned a Honorary Diploma for Best Actor in a Leading Role at the 32nd Fajr International Film Festival and received praise from critics for his performances.

2015: Crazy Rook 
Jadidi became known when he played Pirouz, the main character in the 2015 thriller drama Crazy Rook. The film was highly praised by critics and the audience at the 33rd Fajr Film Festival and won both Best Film and Audience Choice of Best Film, making it one of only five films in The history of cinema of Iran to win the latter (the other four are The Glass Agency, Low Heights, In Amethyst Color and Midday Adventures).

2016–2017: Rising popularity and breakthrough 
In 2016 he starred in four films, In Atousa's Laughter he acted alongside Baran Kosari, Pejman Bazeghi and Mohammad Reza Foroutan.

Jadidi's performance in Soheil Beiraghi's I (2016) grabbed the industry's attention and received critical acclaim. He earned his first Crystal Simorgh, Hafez Award and Iran's Film Critics and Writers Association nominations for his acting.

His third 2016 film A Dragon Arrives! was selected to compete for the Golden Bear at the 66th Berlin International Film Festival and received good reviews.

In Phenomenon, his last 2016 film he starred alongside Hedieh Tehrani. The film is directed by the controversial director Ali Ahmadzadeh and it's still unreleased.

In 2017 he acted in Masoud Kimiai's Domestic Killer alongside Parviz Parastui, Parviz Poorhosseini, Hamid Reza Azarang and Pegah Ahangarani. He earned his second Hafez Award nomination for his performance.

2018–2020: Wide recognition
In 2018 he starred in Bahram Tavakoli's The Lost Strait, Soheil Beiraghi's Cold Sweat and Ramtin Lavafipour's Hat-trick.

He won the Crystal Simorgh for Best Actor for his performances in Cold Sweat and The Lost Strait. Jadidi earned Hafez Award, Iran's Film Critics and Writers Association and Iran Cinema Celebration nominations for his performance as Yaser Shah Hosseini in Cold Sweat. He also received an Iran's Film Critics and Writers Association nomination for his role in The Lost Strait.

In 2019 he played his first comedy film in Rambod Javan's Murphy's Law alongside Amir Jafari. The film received mixed reviews by critics but was a commercial success.

He starred in Saeid Malekan's directing debut Day Zero (2020) and earned his third Crystal Simorgh nomination. Jadidi played a security officer who is involved in the arresting of the famous terrorist Abdolmalek Rigi.

He received his first theater acting award in 2020 at the 38th Fajr Theater Festival for his performance in Herring (2019) which he also produced.

2021: Acclaim and worldwide recognition through A Hero 
In 2021 he starred in Asghar Farhadi's universally acclaimed film A Hero which was selected to compete for the Palme d'Or At the 2021 Cannes Film Festival. The film won the Grand Prix and also was selected as the Iranian entry for the Best International Feature Film at the 94th Academy Awards but was not nominated. The film garnered Jadidi international recognition and earned him his first Hafez Award and Palm Springs International Film Festival award in addition to nomination for Best Performance by an Actor at the 14th Asia Pacific Screen Awards. Jadidi's performance as a single father was highly praised by critics and brought him wide recognition.

2022–present: Play directing
In 2022 he directed and also played in the 300 play on the Sa'dabad Complex stage alongside Ali Nassirian, Javad Ezzati and Tannaz Tabatabaei.

In June 2022, he was invited to be a member of Academy of Motion Picture Arts and Sciences.

Filmography

Film

Television

Music video

Theatre

Awards and nominations

References

External links
Amir Jadidi Website

1984 births
Living people
People from Tehran
Iranian male actors
Male actors from Tehran
Iranian male film actors
Iranian male stage actors
Iranian male tennis players
Crystal Simorgh for Best Actor winners